Kardex may refer to:

 Kardex Group, a Swiss data-storage corporation
 Kardex (MAR), a genericised trademark for a medication administration record
 Tonawanda Kardex, an American football team active 1916–1921

See also
 CardEx, an international phone-card event and expo in the 1990s
 Kardex is an early genericized trademark for visible files, an early product of Kardex Group